The Supporters' Shield is an annual award given to the Major League Soccer team with the best regular season record, as determined by the MLS points system. The Supporters' Shield has been annually awarded at the MLS Supporters' Summit since 1999 (with the winners between 1996 and 1998 awarded retroactively), and has been recognized as a major trophy by the league. It echoes the practice of the top European leagues in which the team with the best record is the champion. Since 2006, the Supporters' Shield winner has earned a berth in the CONCACAF Champions League if they are an American-based team.

D.C. United and LA Galaxy, with four Supporters' Shields each, have won the most shields of any MLS team. Los Angeles FC are the 2022 holders of the Supporters' Shield, winning it for the second time.

History

Conception and fundraising 

When Major League Soccer had its inaugural season in 1996, the league resembled its contemporary North American leagues. After the regular season, the campaign culminated with the MLS Cup Playoffs, en route to the postseason championship match, the MLS Cup. The club with the best regular season record received nothing more than the top seed in the playoffs.

In 1997, soccer fan Nick Lawrus on a listserv proposed the notion of a "Supporters' Scudetto", as a result of the Tampa Bay Mutiny earning the best regular season record but failing to win the 1996 MLS Cup Final. A committee composed of members of all MLS teams' supporters changed the name to "Supporters' Shield" but, due to disagreements between members of the committee, the proposal failed to come to fruition.

The following year, another group led by soccer enthusiast Sam Pierron tried to revive the idea by giving an award to the regular season champions. Since MLS refused to fund the idea, Pierron began fundraising to purchase a trophy with the help of supporters from various MLS clubs. Fundraising was boosted with donations from ESPN commentator Phil Schoen and MLS commissioner Doug Logan. In the end, nearly $3,000 was donated to commission the trophy, which was a chevron made by artist Paula Richardson out of sterling silver sheet metal, for $2,200.

The process to create and purchase the Supporters' Shield was not completed until the tail end of the 1999 season. Although D.C. United were the first MLS club to win the award, the first-place finishes between 1996 and 1998 have all been awarded the honor retroactively, with their names included on the shield at the time of its creation.

Throughout the early to mid-2000s, the Shield received little praise or recognition from MLS or the general public, as the league awarded the MLS Cup winner and runner-up with spots in continental tournaments.

First Shield incentives arrive 

In February 2006, USSF decided that the Supporters' Shield winner and the MLS Cup winner would represent the United States in the CONCACAF Champions League, formerly the CONCACAF Champions' Cup. If the Supporters Shield winner also wins the MLS Cup, the team with the second highest regular season point total qualifies as well.
When the Champions Cup became the CONCACAF Champions League, the United States Soccer Federation gave the Supporters' Shield winner and the MLS Cup winner both direct Group stage spots into the tournament.

On eight occasions (1997, 1999, 2000, 2002, 2008, 2011, 2017, and 2022) the winner of the Supporters' Shield also won the MLS Cup that same year. In 2011, the league announced that the Shield winner's opponent in the MLS Cup quarterfinals would be the lowest-seeded team remaining.

Redesign 

As the Shield began to become more prized and grow in significance along with "supporter culture" growing throughout the league, the idea of creating a new Supporters' Shield began at the MLS Supporters Summit during the 2010 MLS Cup in Toronto. The idea continued to gain traction at the then recently formed Independent Supporters Council (ISC) the following two years in Los Angeles and Portland, Oregon. The Supporter's Shield Foundation was created out of the ISC meeting in Portland in 2012 with a mission to fund the creation of a new shield and to promote and manage the trophy going forward. The cost of the new Shield was quoted at $18,000 with a majority of the funds raised through the "I Support the Shield" scarf drive that culminated in the sale of 2000 supporter scarves. 

With the fundraising complete, in early 2013 the new Supporter's Shield was created. The new shield weighs  and is made of sterling silver and stainless steel. The outside of the shield contains a Telstar soccer ball design while the middle of the shield pays homage to the chevron design of the original trophy. The middle of the trophy was designed to be expandable as its winners' names are added to it annually around the chevron. The newly designed shield was first awarded to the New York Red Bulls on the final day of the 2013 MLS season.

2020 cancellation and reinstatement 

On October 17, 2020, Major League Soccer announced that, following a decision made by the ISC, the Supporters' Shield would not be awarded at the end of the 2020 regular season, largely in part due to the effects that the COVID-19 pandemic  had on the league. In an official announcement, the Supporters' Shield Foundation stated, "After much consideration and discussion, the Supporters' Shield Foundation has decided to forego awarding the Supporters' Shield for the 2020 season. This is not an easy decision to make. With the inability for supporters to be in attendance and fill their stadiums with passion, however, we feel as though the current climate goes against the spirit of the Shield." 

This decision caused a great amount of backlash from the MLS community, and was criticized by several members of MLS clubs, including Toronto FC head coach Greg Vanney (whose team was top of the Supporters' Shield standings at the time of the decision). Following these negative responses, on October 23 the Supporters' Shield Foundation announced they had reversed their original decision, and the Shield was reinstated for the 2020 season. The Philadelphia Union won the Supporters' Shield, but were unable to use the actual shield due to a delay in shipping from Los Angeles. A temporary replacement was fashioned from a repurposed Captain America shield with a vinyl cover by the Union's fabricator shop and lifted by the players.

Winners 
Fifteen different teams have won at least one Supporters' Shield, with the LA Galaxy and D.C. United level with the most wins at four each. Seven teams have gone on to win the MLS Cup after winning the Supporters' Shield, with both the Galaxy and D.C. achieving this double twice. While three teams have secured a Supporters' Shield and U.S. Open Cup double, no American team has won all three major domestic trophies (the Supporters' Shield, MLS Cup and U.S. Open Cup). However, in the 2017 season, Toronto FC managed the Canadian version of this achievement, lifting the Supporters' Shield, MLS Cup and Canadian Championship.

Records

Shield winners 

 Defunct teams in italics.

Performance in CONCACAF competition 

Before 2006, Shield winners were not guaranteed a berth into CONCACAF competitions. Most regular season champions to earn berths into CONCACAF competitions typically earned them from earning a berth into the MLS Cup, or earning a berth due to the number of berths allocated to the United States for MLS. Most times, the United States was allocated two berths into the tournament, which went to the MLS Cup champion and runner-up.

Since 2007, the Shield winner replaced the MLS Cup runner-up as the second American representative for the CONCACAF Champions' Cup. In 2008, with the arrival of the newly formatted CONCACAF Champions League, the Shield winner, along with the MLS Cup winner both earned direct byes into the group stage of the Champions League.

Toronto FC and Los Angeles FC are the only Shield winners to reach the final of a CONCACAF competition. However, as a Canadian team, Toronto FC qualified for the tournament by winning the Canadian Championship and not the Supporters' Shield. D.C. United and the New York Red Bulls hold the record for the earliest exit in a CONCACAF competition as the Shield winners, being eliminated from the group stage in the 2008–09 and 2014–15 editions of the Champions League, respectively.

Key

 QR1 = Qualification first round
 PR = Preliminary round
 GS = Group stage
 R16 = Round of 16
 QF = Quarter-finals
 SF = Semi-finals or consolation match
 F = Final

Performance table

 Notes

See also 

 List of American and Canadian soccer champions
 Presidents' Trophy, an NHL trophy having the same function as the MLS Supporters' Shield
 NWSL Shield, the National Women's Soccer League's version of the Supporters' Shield
 Minor premiership, a similar concept in Australian sports leagues
 Major League Soccer's Wooden Spoon award

Footnotes 

 A.  From 1996 until 1999, tied games were decided by a golden goal, culminating with a shootout
 B.  From 1996 to 1999, 3 points were awarded for a win in 90 minutes, 1 point for a shootout win, and 0 points for a loss in 90 minutes or shootout. Since the 2000 season, 3 points are awarded for a win, 1 point for a tie, and 0 points for a loss.

References 

Supporters' Shield